Brooke Cars Ltd is a British car manufacturer of specialist sports cars, based near Honiton in Devon, England. It was established in 2002, following the purchase of the vehicle rights from Brooke Kensington.

Models
The Double R is similar to the previous 1990s Brooke Kensington ME 190.

References

Car manufacturers of the United Kingdom
Companies based in Devon
Sports car manufacturers